William Webb (born 21 June 1862, date of death unknown) was a British diver. He competed in the men's 10 metre platform event at the 1908 Summer Olympics.

References

External links
 

1862 births
Year of death missing
British male divers
Olympic divers of Great Britain
Divers at the 1908 Summer Olympics
Place of birth missing